The Cambridge, Massachusetts City Hall is the city hall for Cambridge, Massachusetts, located at 795 Massachusetts Avenue, and built in the Richardsonian Romanesque style.  The building additionally serves as a centerpiece of the surrounding City Hall Historic District and adjacent Central Square Historic District.

History
The hall was built between 1888–1889, and was largely funded through a donation from Frederick Hastings Rindge. The architects were Longfellow, Alden & Harlow (Alexander Wadsworth Longfellow, Jr., 1854–1934; Frank E. Alden, 1859–1908; and Alfred B. Harlow, 1857–1927). The building is three stories tall, with a bell tower that rises to 158 feet. Load-bearing stone walls are of Milford granite trimmed with Longmeadow brownstone.

Cambridge City Hall houses offices for the city council, the city manager and several municipal departments. In addition to the main building, the city of Cambridge also houses several other departments a couple of city blocks away in the City Hall Annex, located at Broadway and Inman Street.

On May 17, 2004, shortly after midnight, the first legal applications in the United States for marriage licenses for same-sex couples were issued at Cambridge City Hall. At 9:15 a.m. that day, the Cambridge City Clerk began solemnizing same-sex marriages. See same-sex marriage in Massachusetts.

References

External links

Official page for city of Cambridge
 Datasheet at Towerclocks.org

Government of Cambridge, Massachusetts
Richardsonian Romanesque architecture in Massachusetts
Buildings and structures in Cambridge, Massachusetts
Cambridge
Clock towers in Massachusetts
Government buildings completed in 1889
Historic district contributing properties in Massachusetts
National Register of Historic Places in Cambridge, Massachusetts
City and town halls on the National Register of Historic Places in Massachusetts